Peter Adam may refer to:
 Peter Adam (filmmaker) (1929–2019), British filmmaker and author
 Peter Adam (minister) (born 1946), Australian Christian minister
 Peter R. Adam (born 1957), German film editor
 Peter Adam (director) (born 1945), see Jan Fantl

See also
 Peter Adams (disambiguation)